Meghan Tierney (born January 15, 1997) is a two time Olympian American snowboarder. She competed at the 2018 Winter Olympics  in snowboardcross, and 2022 Winter Olympics, in  Women's snowboard cross.

Early life 
Born in Long Branch, New Jersey, Tierney was raised in Rumson, New Jersey and nearby Little Silver. She began snowboarding at age ten. Her family moved to Edwards, Colorado to allow Meghan and her siblings, Chris, Daniel, and Makayla, to further their snowboarding training. Meghan attended the Vail Ski & Snowboard Academy for her first two years of high school before transferring to the International Snowboard Training Center.

Career 
At the Junior level, Tierney placed 4th in snowboardcross at the 2014 FIS Junior World Championships and 15th in snowboardcross at the 2016 FIS Junior World Championships. Tierney is the only US athlete ever to win both the NORAM and Europa Cup Championships. She also took 10th place at the 2016 X-GAMES in SBX.

In November 2016, Tierney fell during a training camp in Austria, breaking the L3 vertebrae in her back. The injury forced Tierney to sit out the rest of the 2016-17 season. Tierney placed 25th and 31st in her first World Cup races of the 2017-18 season. Tierney finished the final World Cup race before Olympic selection in seventh, the top-placing American woman at the event. She was selected to compete in snowboardcross for the United States at the 2018 Winter Olympics in Pyeongchang.

References

External links
 
 
 
 
 

1997 births
People from Eagle County, Colorado
People from Little Silver, New Jersey
People from Long Branch, New Jersey
People from Rumson, New Jersey
Sportspeople from Monmouth County, New Jersey
American female snowboarders
Living people
Snowboarders at the 2018 Winter Olympics
Snowboarders at the 2022 Winter Olympics
Olympic snowboarders of the United States